Parasika was an ancient kingdom inhabited by the Parasikas tribe and mentioned in the Indian epic the Mahabharata.

A king named Parasarya is mentioned at two locations in Mahabharata, at 2:4 and at 2:7. It is not clear if he belonged to the Parasikas.

See also 
Kingdoms of Ancient India

External links

Kingdoms in the Mahabharata